The Battle of Lahore (Jang-e-Lāhaur, Hindi: लाहौर की लड़ाई; Lāhaur kī laḍ.āī), also referred to as the Lahore Front, constitutes a series of battles fought in and around the Pakistani city of Lahore during the Indo-Pakistani War of 1965. The battle ended in a victory for India, as it was able to thrust through and hold key choke points in Pakistan while having gained around 360 to 500 square kilometres of territory. Indian forces halted their assault on Lahore once they had captured the village of Burki on its outskirts. The rationale for this was that a ceasefire−negotiated by the United States and the Soviet Union−was to be signed soon, and had India captured Lahore, It would have most likely been returned to the process of ceasefire negotiations.

Prelude
After losing hope in the likelihood of a plebiscite being conducted in Kashmir, the Pakistan Army sent infiltrators into the Indian-administered state of Jammu and Kashmir through a covert operation, dubbed Operation Gibraltar, with the aim of stirring unrest among the Kashmiri locals against Indian rule and instigating a rebellion. The operation failed due to a variety of contributing factors, and the infiltrators' presence was soon disclosed to the Indian military. India responded by deploying more troops in the Kashmir Valley and the Indian Army subsequently began its assault against the infiltrators operating in the region. Pakistan launched a major offensive named Operation Grand Slam on 1 September 1965 in Indian-administered Jammu and Kashmir, in an effort to relieve pressure on the infiltrators who had been surrounded and were holding out against Indian forces after the failure of Operation Gibraltar. Operation Grand Slam also aimed to assault and capture the Akhnoor bridge, which would not only cut off Indian supply lines, but also allow the Pakistani military to threaten Jammu, an important logistical point for Indian forces. The operation saw Pakistani forces go on the offensive and aggressively push into and take strategically vital points in Kashmir. In order to relieve the mounting pressure on the Kashmir front, India's counterattack saw its forces crossing the international border and invading the Pakistani province of Punjab, with the intention of diverting Pakistan's military units in Kashmir, where Indian troops were at a severe disadvantage.

The battle

On the night of 5–6 September 1965, Indian XI Corps began its operations by advancing towards Lahore along three axes – Amritsar-Lahore, Khalra-Burki- Lahore and Khem Karan-Kasur roads, overwhelming the small Pakistani force. Pakistan's 10 and 11 Divisions, which were deployed in the sector, began a series of rather confused delaying actions, and by the end of the first day the Indian infantry, backed by heavy armoured troops, were within striking distance of Lahore city. Some advance Indian units managed to capture Ichhogil canal on 6 September, but soon withdrew, since support and reinforcements were not expected to reach any time soon.

Pakistani soon launched a three-pronged counterattack to counter Indian assault on 8 September backed by its newly created 1 and 6 Armoured division to break through the front line formed by Indian 4 Grenadiers, 9 Jammu and Kashmir rifles, 1 & 9 Gurkha rifles and Rajput Rifles.

On 8th, Pakistan began a counterattack south of Lahore from Kasur towards Khem Karan, an Indian town 5 km from the International Border. This was followed by another major armoured on 9 and 10 September to recapture lost ground despite heavy toll on Pakistani armour. The Pakistani counterattack led to the capture of the village Khem Karan. However, a massive Indian counterattack repulsed the Pakistani forces from this sector of Indian territory. Continued heavy attrition specially on Pakistani armour however meant Pakistan could not continue the counterattack from 10 onwards.

Along the Amritsar-Lahore and Khalra-Burki-Lahore axis in middle Indian infantry won decisive battle at Burki. Pakistani counterattack which started on 8th Pakistani artillery pounding Indian advance on 8,9 and 10 September. Indian units continued their advance, and by 22 September, had reached the Ichhogil canal protecting the city of Lahore. Pakistani counterattacks were effectively tackled at Burki with little armour support on 10th punishing Pakistani armour. Indian advance then moved on to capture Dograi, a town in the immediate vicinity of Lahore. After reaching the outskirts of Lahore Indian Army ensured that Lahore came under constant Indian tank fire to prepare for the main assault on Lahore city before ceasefire was announced.

In the north India won another decisive battle at Phillora supported by its 1 Armoured Division on 11th destroying the Pakistani counterattack. Indians continued to advance towards Chawinda in the north from Phillora and reached Chawinda by 17 September. However, they were halted at Chawinda till ceasefire on 22 September. This was a result of the exceptional defences backed by artillery were created by Pakistani Brigadier A.A.K. Niazi who had started preparing the defences soon after fall of Phillora. The Indian attack in the north only lost momentum at the Battle of Chawinda, after more than 500 km2 of Pakistani territory had been captured. The Pakistanis were helped by the fact that the network of canals and streams in the sector made for natural defensive barriers. In addition, the prepared defence, comprising minefields, dugouts and more elaborate pillboxes, proved problematic for the Indians.

Aftermath

Even after the capture of Dograi on 20–21 September, no attempt was made to capture Lahore and the main assault on Lahore was not launched because a ceasefire was to be signed in the following couple of days and it was known that the city would have been given back to Pakistan even if it was captured. By choosing to attack Lahore, the Indians had managed to relieve pressure from Chumb and Akhnoor in Kashmir, forcing the Pakistan Army to defend further south.

At the end of hostilities on 23 September India retained between 140 square miles and 360 square kilometres of Pakistani territory in the Lahore front including major villages of Bedian, Barki, Padri, Dograi, Bhasin and Ichhogil Uttar along the eastern bank of the Ichhogil canal. Pakistan only gained a small tract of land around Khem Karan of 50 square kilometres.

Gallantry and awards
The Fighting Fifth Battalion of Indian Army which played an important part in capturing Burki was later was conferred with "Battle Honour of Burki" and "Theatre of Honour, Punjab".

The Pakistani commander, Major Raja Aziz Bhatti, was later awarded the Nishan-e-Haider, the highest military decoration given by Pakistan for the battle at Burki, posthumously. Each year, he is honoured in Pakistan on 6 September, which is also known as Defence Day.

Notes

References

Further reading
 Harry Chinchinian, India Pakistan in War and Peace 

Lahore, Battle of
Lahore
1965 in India
1965 in Pakistan